Abraham Miguel Cardozo (also Cardoso; c. 1626–1706) was a Sabbatean prophet and physician born in Rio Seco, Spain.

Biography
A descendant of Marranos from around the city of Celorico, in the province of Beira, Portugal, he studied medicine at the University of Salamanca together with his older brother Fernando Isaac, and while the latter was given to his studies, Michael spent his time in singing serenades under ladies' balconies. After having completed his education, he left Spain for Venice. There, probably at the instigation of his brother, he embraced Judaism and received the name "Abraham". Later he established himself as a physician at Livorno, but did not meet with much success until his recommendation by the Grand Duke of Tuscany to Othman, the bey of Tripoli.

Becoming thereafter fairly prosperous, Cardoso married two wives, and began to devote himself to kabbalistic speculations, in which he appears to have been previously initiated at Livorno by Moses Pinheiro. With the appearance of the Shabbethaian movement, he assumed the character of a prophet, pretending to have had dreams and visions, and sent circulars in all directions to support the Messianic claim of Sabbatai Zevi. Cardoso's pretended or actual belief in the Messiah was not renounced even when Zevi embraced Islam; he justified the latter on the plea that it was necessary for him to be counted among the sinners, in order that he might atone for Israel's sins, in a common messianic interpretation to Isaiah LIII that resembles in many ways the early Christian messianic interpretation of that chapter. Later Cardoso gave himself out as "Messiah ben Ephraim", asserting that the Messiah is he who teaches the true conception of God. This conception Cardoso expounded in nearly all his writings: that the true God is not the "En-Sof", but the "Keter 'Elyon", the first being a passive power which has no connection with the world.

Being endowed with great eloquence, Cardoso had many followers, but many enemies as well. An influential personage, Isaac Lumbroso, by spending much money, obtained his banishment from Tripoli. Cardoso then wandered from place to place, trying to lead people astray by his prophecies and visions, but meeting no success, as the rabbis had issued warnings against his vagaries. In 1703 he settled at Cairo and became the physician of the pasha of Egypt. Three years later, in 1706, he was assassinated by his nephew during a discussion on money matters.

Works 
Cardoso was the author of many Kabbalistic and polemical works, of which only two are still extant: 
 Boḳer Abraham (Dawn of Abraham), a Kabbalistic work in two volumes (Neubauer, Cat. Bodl. Hebr. MSS. No. 1441), an extract of which was published by Isaac Lopez in Kur Maẓref ha-Emunot,
 Ha-Ketab (The Writing), published in Weiss's Bet ha-Midrash, 1865.

Cardoso's other works were: 

 Zeh Eli;
 Ḥokmato Shel Abraham Abinu
 Sefer ha-Ma'or
 Or Ẓaḥ we-Meẓuḳḳaḳ
 Wikkuaḥ Kellali
 Sullam Ya'aḳob
 Ḥereb Pipiyyot
 Elohe Abi
 Shema'Ḳaddishah
 Ṭob Adonai la-Kol
 Derush Amen
 Ereẓ Yisrael
 Sod Ḥai 'Alamin
 Derush ha-Ketab
 Solet Neḳiyyah
 Raza de-Razin

See also
Jewish Messiah claimants

Notes

Jewish encyclopedia bibliography 
Heinrich Grätz, Gesch. der Juden, x.228, 229, 301;
Kahana, Eben ha-To'im, pp. 53 et seq.;
Moses Gaster, History of Bevis Marks, pp. 109 et seq.

References

1630s births
1706 deaths
Sabbateans
Spanish Jews
University of Salamanca alumni